Achanak is a 1998 Indian action thriller film directed by Naresh Malhotra starring Govinda and Manisha Koirala. The film was a box office failure. During a song in the climax, Govinda's getup resembles Jim Carrey's in The Mask.

Plot
Wealthy industrialist Yashpal Nanda (Saeed Jaffrey) is widowed and lives with his daughter, Nisha (Pinky Singh), and two sons, Vijay (Rahul Roy), and Arjun (Govinda). He gets Nisha married to Nilesh (Dalip Tahil), while Vijay marries Madhu (Farah Naaz), and Yashpal is on the look-out for a suitable bride for Arjun. Arjun lives a charmed life, surrounded by the family he loves and working at his family's thriving business. Then he meets Pooja (Manisha Koirala), and his life gets even better. The two quickly fall in love. Yashpal is overjoyed and happy with Arjun's choice and cannot wait for them to get married. The Nanda family's world gets turned upside down when Nisha and then Vijay pass away suddenly, leaving the family devastated. Pooja is mistakenly convicted of murder, and Arjun must save her while he keeps up his family responsibilities, but his father soon meets a cruel end as well. The police arrive on the scene to arrest Arjun for murder.  Now, on the run from both the police and the mysterious criminals, Arjun and Pooja work to expose the truth while evading a fate at the hands of either.

Cast 
Govinda as Arjun Nanda
Manisha Koirala as Pooja
Sanjay Dutt (Cameo)
Shahrukh Khan (Cameo)
Farha Naaz as Madhu Nanda
Rahul Roy as Vijay Nanda
Johnny Lever as Joni / Moni / Toni Kapoor
Pinky Singh as Nisha Nanda
Saeed Jaffrey as Yashpal Nanda 
Paresh Rawal as Sagar Srivastav 
Dalip Tahil as Nilesh
Tinnu Anand as Police Inspector Pandey 
Vishwajeet Pradhan as Sagar Srivastav's Henchman
Navneet Nishan as Anjali
Dinesh Hingoo as P.K Sharma
Viju Khote as Veternity Dr. M.Dasturi

Soundtrack

References

External links

Planet Bollywood review

1990s Hindi-language films
Indian action thriller films
Films scored by Dilip Sen-Sameer Sen